The SDB Karat is a Russian ultralight trike that was designed and produced by SDB of Moscow. The aircraft was supplied as a complete ready-to-fly-aircraft.

SDB was an enterprise of the Moscow State Technical University of Civil Aviation. The SDB website has been removed from the internet and the enterprise seems to have gone out of business, ending production of the Karat.

Design and development
It features a cable-braced hang glider-style high-wing, weight-shift controls, a single-seat open cockpit without a cockpit fairing, tricycle landing gear and a single engine in pusher configuration.

The aircraft is made from bolted-together aluminum tubing, with its single or double surface wing covered in Dacron sailcloth. It was designed to be light enough to accept any hang glider wing with a high enough gross weight. A typical wing used would have a  span, be supported by a single tube-type kingpost and use an "A" frame weight-shift control bar. The standard powerplant is a single cylinder, air-cooled, two-stroke,  Hirth F33 engine.

When it was available the trike was sold as a fuselage frame and engine, with the customer providing the hang glider wing.

Specifications (Karat)

References

External links
Company website archives on Archive.org
Photo of the SDB Karat

2000s Russian sport aircraft
2000s Russian ultralight aircraft
Single-engined pusher aircraft
Ultralight trikes